Verticordia paludosa is a flowering plant in the myrtle family, Myrtaceae and is endemic to the south-west of Western Australia. It is an openly branched shrub with small leaves and pink to magenta flowers with spreading, feathery sepals and erect, fringed petals in summer and autumn.

Description

Before the flower opens the bud is enclosed by two fringed bracteoles. Flowering time is from December to May.

Taxonomy and naming
Verticordia paludosa was first formally described by Alex George in 1991 and the description was published in Nuytsia. The specific epithet (paludosa) is a Latin word meaning "marshy" referring to the habitat where this species is often found.

George placed this species in subgenus Eperephes, section Verticordella along with V. pennigera, V. halophila, V. bifimbriata, V. lindleyi, V. blepharophylla, V. drummondii, V. wonganensis,V. mitodes, V. luteola, V. attenuata, V. tumida, V. carinata, V. centipeda, V. auriculata, V. pholidophylla, V. spicata and V. hughanii.

Distribution and habitat
This verticordia grows in sand and loam in areas that are wet in winter and in sandy loam on ridges in shrubland and woodland. It occurs between Mogumber, Gillingarra, Regans Ford and the Moore River National Park in the Geraldton Sandplains, Jarrah Forest and Swan Coastal Plain biogeographic regions.

Conservation
Verticordia paludosa is classified as "Priority Four" by the Western Australian Government Department of Parks and Wildlife, meaning that is rare or near threatened.

Use in horticulture
Verticordia paludosa can be propagated from cuttings but these are slow to strike and the plants produced are also slow growing. The species seems to be resistant to disease but watering in hot dry weather is necessary.

References

paludosa
Rosids of Western Australia
Eudicots of Western Australia
Plants described in 1991